Duale is both a given name and surname of Somali origin. Notable people with the name include:

Surname:
 Ahmed Hassan Ibrahim Duale, Somali entrepreneur
 Aden Duale (born 1969), Kenyan politician, Majority Leader of the National Assembly
 Elmi Ahmed Duale, Somali physician, diplomat and politician
 Elmi Duale, Somali diplomat
 Hussein Ali Duale, Somaliland ambassador and finance minister

Given name:
 Duale Adan Mohamed, Somali politician

Somali-language surnames
Somali given names